
Gmina Zbrosławice is a rural gmina (administrative district) in Tarnowskie Góry County, Silesian Voivodeship, in southern Poland. Its seat is the village of Zbrosławice (germ.

Villages
Gmina Zbrosławice contains the villages and settlements of Boniowice, Czekanów, Jasiona, Jaśkowice, Kamieniec, Karchowice, Kopienica, Księży Las, Laryszów, Łubie, Łubki, Miedary, Przezchlebie, Ptakowice, Świętoszowice, Szałsza, Wieszowa, Wilkowice, Zawada, Zbrosławice and Ziemięcice.

Neighbouring gminas
Gmina Zbrosławice is bordered by the towns of Bytom, Gliwice, Pyskowice, Tarnowskie Góry and Zabrze, and by the gminas of Toszek, Tworóg and Wielowieś.

Twin towns – sister cities

Gmina Zbrosławice is twinned with:
 Brackenheim, Germany
 Castagnole delle Lanze, Italy
 Charnay-lès-Mâcon, France
 Tarnalelesz, Hungary

References

Zbroslawice
Tarnowskie Góry County